FC Bayern Munich II played the 2020–21 season in the 3. Liga. Bayern Munich II are the defending 3. Liga champions.

Review and events
Bayern Munich II came into the 2020–21 season as the defending 3. Liga champions. On 25 August 2020, Holger Seitz became manager of Bayern II. Bayern II's season started on 19 September 2020 against Türkgücü München. The match finished in a 2–2 draw. Bayern II finished September with a 3–0 loss to SC Verl. Bayern II finished September in 18th place. Bayern II started October with a 3–0 win against Dynamo Dresden on 2 October 2020. With the win, Bayern II jumped up 10 places to eighth place. Bayern II drew it's matches against KFC Uerdingen 05 and 1. FC Kaiserslautern. The pair of draws dropped Bayern II down to 13th place. Bayern II's only loss in October happened against Viktoria Köln. Bayern II finished October with a 2–0 win against Waldhof Mannheim on 25 October 2020. Bayern II finished October in 11th place. November started with a 4–2 win against Wehen Wiesbaden on 1 November 2020. However, they went on to lose to 1. FC Magdeburg, VfB Lübeck, FC Ingolstadt 04, and Hansa Rostock in November. Bayern II finished November in the relegation zone (17th place). In December, Bayern II defeated1. FC Saarbrücken on 13 December 2020, and drew MSV Duisburg on 16 December 2020 and SpVgg Unterhaching on 19 December 2020. Bayern II finished 2020 in 16th place. Bayern II started 2021 with a 2–0 loss to 1860 Munich on 9 January 2021. Bayern's first win in 2021 came against SV Meppen on 12 January 2021. Bayern II finished January with a 0–0 draw on 22 January 2021. Bayern II finished January in 12th place. In February, Bayern II won only one out of five matches. The win came against FSV Zwickau on 10 February 2021. Bayern finished February with a 1–1 draw against Dynamo Dresden on 24 February 2021. Bayern II finished February in 11th place. Bayern II started March with a 2–2 draw against Waldhof Mannheim on 1 March 2021. Then Bayern II defeated Wehen Wiesbaden on 7 March 2021. Bayern II finished March with losses to SC Verl, 1. FC Magdeburg, and SV Meppen. On 2 April 2021, Bayern Munich announced that both Martín Demichelis and Danny Schwarz will replace Seitz as Bayern II managers. Bayern also announced that his last match was against VfB Lübeck. Bayern II lost 3–2 to VfB Lübeck.

Match results

References

FC Bayern Munich II seasons
Bayern Munich II